The river frog is a species of aquatic frog in the family Ranidae.

River frog may also refer to:

Frogs
 African river frog (Phrynobatrachus), a genus of frogs that form the monogeneric family Phrynobatrachidae found in Sub-Saharan Africa
 Blyth's river frog (Limnonectes blythii), a frog in the family Dicroglossidae found from Myanmar through western Thailand and the Malay Peninsula (Malaysia, Singapore) to Sumatra and Borneo (Indonesia)
 Giant river frog (Limnonectes leporinus), a frog in the family Dicroglossidae endemic to Borneo found in Brunei, Kalimantan (Indonesia), and Sabah and Sarawak (Malaysia)
 Malaysian river frog (Limnonectes malesianus), a frog in the family Dicroglossidae found on the Malay Peninsula (including extreme southern peninsular Thailand and Singapore), Sumatra, Java, Borneo (Indonesia, Malaysia), and a range of islands on the Sunda Shelf
 River frog (Brazil) (Thoropa), a genus of frogs in the family Cycloramphidae from eastern and southeastern Brazil
 River frog (Cacosterninae) (Amietia), a genus of frogs in the family Pyxicephalidae, endemic to central and southern Africa
 Rocky river frog (Arthroleptides), a genus of frogs in the family Petropedetidae found in the mountains of East Africa (Tanzania, Kenya, and probably Uganda)
 Spencer's river tree frog (Litoria spenceri), a frog in the family Hylidae endemic to Australia
 Timor river frog (Limnonectes timorensis), a frog in the family Dicroglossidae endemic to the island of Timor

Other
 Louisville RiverFrogs, a former professional ice hockey team based in Louisville, Kentucky, 1995–1998
 Rowdy River Frog, the mascot of the Louisville RiverFrogs

Animal common name disambiguation pages